Elegant anemone may refer to two different species of sea anemone:

 Actinoporus elegans, found in the tropical Atlantic Ocean
 Sagartia elegans,  found in coastal areas of north-western Europe